Symplekin is a protein that in humans is encoded by the SYMPK gene.

Function 

This gene encodes a nuclear protein that functions in the regulation of polyadenylation and promotes gene expression. The protein forms a high-molecular weight complex with components of the polyadenylation machinery. It is thought to serve as a scaffold for recruiting regulatory factors to the polyadenylation complex. It also participates in 3'-end maturation of histone mRNAs, which do not undergo polyadenylation. The protein also localizes to the cytoplasmic plaques of tight junctions in some cell types.

Model organisms

Model organisms have been used in the study of SYMPK function. A conditional knockout mouse line, called Sympktm1a(EUCOMM)Wtsi was generated as part of the International Knockout Mouse Consortium program — a high-throughput mutagenesis project to generate and distribute animal models of disease to interested scientists.

Male and female animals underwent a standardized phenotypic screen to determine the effects of deletion. Twenty five tests were carried out on mutant mice and two significant abnormalities were observed. No homozygous mutant embryos were identified during gestation, and thus none survived until weaning. The remaining tests were carried out on heterozygous mutant adult mice; no additional significant abnormalities were observed in these animals.

Interactions 

SYMPK has been shown to interact with CSTF2, HSF1 and Oct4

References

Further reading 

 
 
 
 
 
 
 
 
 
 
 
 

Genes mutated in mice